Damiano Mazza may refer to:
 Damiano Mazza (artist)
 Damiano Mazza (rugby union)